Tarzan and Jane (or Edgar Rice Burroughs' Tarzan and Jane) is a computer-animated web series, produced by  Arad Animation, 41 Entertainment and Arc Productions and is based on the 1912 novel Tarzan of the Apes by Edgar Rice Burroughs.

The first season streamed on Netflix on January 6, 2017. The second season streamed on October 12, 2018.

From December 13 to December 21, 2019, the series rerun on Discovery Family.

Premise
Saved from a plane crash and given supernatural powers, a teenaged Tarzan joins forces with a brave city girl called Jane Porter to protect his jungle home from threats.

Voice cast
Giles Panton as Tarzan / John Clayton III and Jeremy
Rebecca Shoichet as Jane Porter
Marci T. House as Angela Porter
Paul Dobson as Dr. Porter and Earl of Greystroke
Michael Dobson as Clayton Greystroke
Brian Dobson as Shopkeeper and Goon 4
Doron Bell as Muviro Wazari and Shaman
Kathleen Barr as Kala and Veronica Smythefield (episode 3-4), ICB agent (episode 4)
Omari Newton as Chief Wazari
Lee Tockar as King Kong
Eden Gamliel as Emily
Bradley Duffy as Boss
Ian Hanlin as Goon 2
Francisco Trujillo as Goon 1
Sam Vincent as Staff Member

Episodes

Series overview

Season 1 (2017)

Season 2 (2018)

References

External links
 

2010s American animated television series
2010s Canadian animated television series
2017 American television series debuts
2017 Canadian television series debuts
2017 web series debuts
2018 American television series endings
2018 Canadian television series endings
2018 web series endings
American children's animated action television series
American children's animated adventure television series
American children's animated drama television series
American children's animated science fantasy television series
American computer-animated television series
Canadian children's animated action television series
Canadian children's animated adventure television series
Canadian children's animated drama television series
Canadian children's animated science fantasy television series
Canadian computer-animated television series
Television shows based on American novels
English-language Netflix original programming
Animated Tarzan television series
Netflix children's programming
Animated television series by Netflix
Science fantasy web series
Animated television series about orphans